Markus Günthardt (born 10 September 1957) is a Swiss former tennis player. Günthardt won three doubles titles during his professional career. The right-hander reached his highest ATP doubles ranking on 17 September 1984, when he became the number 44 in the world.

Günthardt participated in 14 Davis Cup ties for Switzerland from 1980–86, posting a 9-5 record in doubles.

Günthardt's younger brother Heinz was a successful doubles player, winning two Grand Slam doubles titles in his career.

Doubles titles (3)

External links
 
 
 

Living people
1957 births
Swiss male tennis players
Tennis players from Zürich
20th-century Swiss people